The subjunctive (also known as conjunctive in some languages) is a grammatical mood, a feature of the utterance that indicates the speaker's attitude towards it. Subjunctive forms of verbs are typically used to express various states of unreality such as: wish, emotion, possibility, judgment, opinion, obligation, or action that has not yet occurred; the precise situations in which they are used vary from language to language. The subjunctive is one of the irrealis moods, which refer to what is not necessarily real. It is often contrasted with the indicative, a realis mood which is used principally to indicate that something is a statement of fact.

Subjunctives occur most often, although not exclusively, in subordinate clauses, particularly that-clauses. Examples of the subjunctive in English are found in the sentences "I suggest that you be careful" and "It is important that she stay by your side."

Indo-European languages

Proto-Indo-European
The Proto-Indo-European language, the reconstructed common ancestor of the Indo-European languages, had two closely related moods: the subjunctive and the optative. Many of its daughter languages combined or merged these moods.

In Indo-European, the subjunctive was formed by using the full ablaut grade of the root of the verb, and appending the thematic vowel *-e- or *-o- to the root stem, with the full, primary set of personal inflections.  The subjunctive was the Indo-European irrealis, used for hypothetical or counterfactual situations.

The optative mood was formed with a suffix *-ieh1 or *-ih1 (with a laryngeal).  The optative used the clitic set of secondary personal inflections.  The optative was used to express wishes or hopes.

Among the Indo-European languages, only Albanian, Avestan, Ancient Greek, and Sanskrit kept the subjunctive and the optative fully separate and parallel. However, in Sanskrit, use of the subjunctive is found only in the Vedic language of the earliest times, and the optative and imperative are comparatively less commonly used. In the later language (from c. 500 BC), the subjunctive fell out of use, with the optative or imperative being used instead, or merged with the optative as in Latin. However, the first-person forms of the subjunctive continue to be used, as they are transferred to the imperative, which formerly, like Greek, had no first person forms.

Germanic languages
In the Germanic languages, subjunctives are also usually formed from old optatives (a mood that indicates a wish or hope), with the present subjunctive marked with *-ai- and the past with *-ī-. In German, these forms have been reduced to a schwa, spelled -e. The past tense, however, often displays i-umlaut. In Old Norse, both suffixes evolved into -i-, but i-umlaut occurs in the past subjunctive, which distinguishes them.

The table below shows the Old Norse active paradigm (set of rules) for the verb grafa (“to dig”):

English

In Modern English, the subjunctive is realised as a finite but tenseless clause where the main verb occurs in the bare form. Since the bare form is also used in a variety of other constructions, the English subjunctive is reflected by a clause type rather than a distinct inflectional paradigm.

German

German has two forms of the subjunctive mood, namely Konjunktiv I (KI) 'present subjunctive' and Konjunktiv II (KII) 'past subjunctive'. Despite their English names, both German subjunctives can be used for past and present time.

Konjunktiv I

The present subjunctive occurs in certain expressions, (e.g. Es lebe der König! "Long live the king!") and in indirect (reported) speech. Its use can frequently be replaced by the indicative mood. For example, Er sagte, er sei Arzt ('He said he was a physician') is a neutral representation of what was said and makes no claim as to whether the speaker thinks the reported statement is true or not.

The past subjunctive can often be used to express the same sentiments: Er sagte, er wäre Arzt. Or, for example, instead of the formal, written Er sagte, er habe keine Zeit 'He said he had no time' with present subjunctive 'habe', one can use past subjunctive 'hätte': Er sagte, er hätte keine Zeit.

In speech, however, the past subjunctive is common without any implication that the speaker doubts the speech he is reporting. As common is use of the indicative Er sagte, er ist Arzt and Er sagte, er hat keine Zeit. This is often changed in written reports to the forms using present subjunctive.

The present subjunctive is completely regular for all verbs except the verb sein ("to be"). It is formed by adding -e, -est, -e, -en, -et, -en to the stem of the infinitive. The verb sein has the stem sei- for the present subjunctive declension, but it has no ending for the first and third person singular. While the use of present subjunctive for reported speech is formal and common in newspaper articles, its use in colloquial speech is in continual decline.

It is possible to express the subjunctive in various tenses, including the perfect (er sei da gewesen 'he has [apparently] been there') and the future (er werde da sein 'he will be there'). For the preterite, which forms the Konjunktiv II with a somewhat other meaning, indirect speech has to switch to the perfect tense, so that: "Er sagte: 'Ich war da.'" becomes "Er sagte, er sei da gewesen".

Konjunktiv II

The KII  or past subjunctive is used to form the conditional tense and, on occasion, as a replacement for the present subjunctive when both indicative and subjunctive moods of a particular verb are indistinguishable.

Every German verb has a past subjunctive conjugation, but in spoken German the conditional is most commonly formed using würde (Konjunktiv II form of werden which in here is related to the English will or would rather than the literal to become; dialect: täte, KII of tun 'to do') with an infinitive. For example: An deiner Stelle würde ich ihm nicht helfen 'I would not help him if I were you'. In the example, the Konjunktiv II form of helfen (hülfe) is very unusual. However, using 'würde' instead of hätte (past subjunctive declension of haben 'to have') and wäre (past subjunctive declension of sein 'to be') can be perceived anywhere from awkward (in-the-present use of the past subjunctive) to incorrect (in the past subjunctive). There is a tendency to use the forms in würde rather in main clauses as in English; in subclauses even regular forms (which sound like the indicative of the preterite and are, thus, obsolete in any other circumstances) can still be heard.

Some verbs exist for which either construction can be used, such as with finden (fände) and tun (täte). Many dictionaries consider the past subjunctive declension of such verbs the only proper expression in formal written German.

The past subjunctive is declined from the stem of the preterite (imperfect) declension of the verb with the appropriate present subjunctive declension ending as appropriate. In most cases, an umlaut is appended to the stem vowel if possible (i.e. if it is a, o, u or au), for example: ich war → ich wäre, ich brachte → ich brächte.

Dutch

Dutch has the same subjunctive tenses as German (described above), though they are rare in contemporary speech. The same two tenses as in German are sometimes considered a subjunctive mood (aanvoegende wijs) and sometimes conditional mood (voorwaardelijke wijs). In practice, potential subjunctive uses of verbs are difficult to differentiate from indicative uses. This is partly because the subjunctive mood has fallen together with the indicative mood:
 The plural of the subjunctive (both present and past) is always identical to the plural of the indicative. There are a few exceptions where the usage is clearly subjunctive, like: "Mogen zij in vrede rusten" (May they rest in peace); compare to singular: "Moge hij/zij in vrede rusten" (May he/she rest in peace).
 In the present tense, the singular form of the subjunctive differs from the indicative, having an extra -e. E.g., the subjunctive "God zegene je, mijn kind" (May God bless you, my child) differs from the indicative "God zegent je, mijn kind" (God blesses you, my child.)
 In the past tense, the singular form of the subjunctive of weak verbs (the vast majority of verbs) does not differ from the indicative at all, so that for those verbs there is no difference between indicative and subjunctive whatsoever in the past tense. Only for strong verbs, the preterite-present verbs and some irregular weak verbs does the past subjunctive differ from the past indicative, and only in the singular form. E.g., the subjunctive "hadde", "ware" and "mochte" differ from the indicative "had", "was" and "mocht" ("had", "was" and "could").

Archaic and traditional phrases still contain the subjunctive mood:
 Men neme ... ([Take (literally "one take"]  ... - as found in recipes)
 Uw naam worde geheiligd (Thy name be hallowed - from the Lord's Prayer)
 Geheiligd zij Uw naam (Hallowed be thy name - from the Lord's Prayer, as used in Belgium until 2016)
 Zo waarlijk helpe mij God almachtig (So truly help me God almighty - when swearing an oath)
 Godverdomme (now a commonly used curse word in Dutch but originally meaning a request to God to curse something)
 God zij dank (meaning Thanks be to God)
 Dank zij (Thanks to - literally meaning Thank be)
 Leve de koning (Long live the king)
Of these, the last 4 examples are still part of daily speech

Luxembourgish
Luxembourgish has the same subjunctive tenses as German (described above). For the periphrasis however, "géif" is used instead of "würde" or (dialectal) "täte".

Latin and the Romance languages

Latin

The Latin subjunctive has many uses, contingent upon the nature of a clause within a sentence:

Within independent clauses:
Exhortation or command
Concession
Wish
Question of doubt
Possibility or contingency

Within dependent clauses:
Condition
Purpose
Characteristic
Result
Time
Indirect questions

Historically, the Latin subjunctive originates from the ancestral optative inflections, while some of the original subjunctive forms went on to compose the Latin future tense, especially in the Latin third conjugation. The *-i- of the old optative forms manifests itself in the fact that the Latin subjunctives typically have a high vowel even when the indicative mood has a lower vowel; for example, Latin rogamus, "we ask", in the indicative mood, corresponds to the subjunctive rogemus, "let us ask", where e is a higher vowel than a.

The subjunctive mood retains a highly distinct form for nearly all verbs in Portuguese, Spanish and Italian (among other Latin languages), and for a number of verbs in French.  All of these languages inherit their subjunctive from Latin, where the subjunctive mood combines both forms and usages from a number of original Indo-European inflection sets, including the original subjunctive and the optative mood.

In many cases, the Romance languages use the subjunctive in the same ways that English does; however, they use them in other ways as well. For example, English generally uses the auxiliary may or let to form desiderative expressions, such as "Let it snow". The Romance languages use the subjunctive for these; French, for example, says, "Qu'il neige" and "Qu'ils vivent jusqu'à leur vieillesse". However, in the case of the first-person plural, these languages have imperative forms: "Let us go" in French is "Allons-y". In addition, the Romance languages tend to use the subjunctive in various kinds of subordinate clauses, such as those introduced by words meaning although English: "Although I am old, I feel young"; French: Bien que je sois vieux, je me sens jeune.

In Spanish, phrases with words like lo que (that which, what), quien (who), or donde (where) and subjunctive verb forms are often translated to English with some variation of "whatever" or sometimes an indefinite pronoun. Spanish "lo que sea", which is, by a literal interpretation, along the lines of "the thing which is", is translated as English "whatever" or "anything"; similarly, Spanish "donde sea" is English "wherever" and Spanish "quien sea" is English "whoever". For example, Spanish "lo que quieras", literally "that which you want", is translated as English "whatever you may want"; Spanish "cueste lo que cueste" is translated to English as "whatever it may cost"; and Spanish "donde vayas, voy" is translated to English as "wherever you go, I go".

French
Present and past subjunctives

The subjunctive is used mostly with verbs or adverbs expressing desire, doubt or eventuality; it may also express an order. It is almost always preceded by the conjunction .

Use of the subjunctive is in many respects similar to English:
 Jussive (issuing orders, commanding, or exhorting):  ("It is necessary that he understand that")
 Desiderative:  ("Long live the republic!")

Sometimes it is not:
 Desiderative:  ("Let there be light!")
 In certain subordinate clauses:
 : ("Even though it is my birthday") (although English does introduce a similar subjunctive element in an alternative: "It might be my birthday, but I am working"
  ("Before I go away")

French uses a past subjunctive, equivalent in tense to the passé composé in the indicative mood, called "passé du subjonctif". It is the only other subjunctive tense used in modern-day conversational French. It is formed with the auxiliary être or avoir and the past participle of the verb. Unlike other Romance languages, such as Spanish, it is not always necessary that the preceding clause be in the past to trigger the passé du subjonctif in the subordinate clause:

Imperfect and pluperfect subjunctives

French also has an imperfect subjunctive, which in older, formal, or literary writing, replaces the present subjunctive in a subordinate clause when the main clause is in a past tense (including in the French conditional, which is morphologically a future-in-the-past): 

Similarly, pluperfect subjunctive replace past subjunctive in same context:

Italian
The Italian subjunctive (congiuntivo) is commonly used, although, especially in the spoken language, it is sometimes substituted by the indicative.

The subjunctive is used mainly in subordinate clauses following a set phrase or conjunction, such as benché, senza che, prima che, or perché. It is also used with verbs of doubt, possibility and expressing an opinion or desire, for example with credo che, è possibile che and ritengo che, and sometimes with superlatives and virtual superlatives.
 English: I believe (that) she is the best.
 Italian: (Io) credo (che) (ella/lei) sia la migliore.

Differently from the French subjunctive, the Italian one is used after expressions like "Penso che" ("I think that"), where in French the indicative would be used. However, it is also possible to use the subjunctive after the expression "Je ne pense pas que..." ("I don't think that..."), and in questions like "Penses-tu que..." ("Do you think that..."), even though the indicative forms are correct, too.

Present subjunctive

The present subjunctive is similar to, but still mostly distinguishable from, the present indicative. Subject pronouns are often used with the present subjunctive where they are normally omitted in the indicative, since in the first, second and third person singular forms they are the same, so the person is not implicitly implied from the verb. Irregular verbs tend to follow the first person singular form, such as the present subjunctive forms of andare, which goes to vada etc. (first person singular form is vado).

The present subjunctive is used in a range of situations in clauses taking the subjunctive.
 English: "It is possible that they have to leave".
 Italian: "È possibile che debbano partire".
 English: "My parents want me to play the piano".
 Italian: "I miei genitori vogliono che io suoni il pianoforte".

The present subjunctive is used mostly in subordinate clauses, as in the examples above. However, exceptions include imperatives using the subjunctive (using the third person), and general statements of desire.
 English: "Be careful!"
 Italian: "Stia attento!"
 English: "Long live the republic!"
 Italian: "Viva la repubblica!"
Imperfect subjunctive

The Italian imperfect subjunctive is very similar in appearance to (but used much more in speech than) the French imperfect subjunctive, and forms are largely regular, apart from the verbs essere, dare and stare (which go to fossi, dessi and stessi etc.). However, unlike in French, where it is often replaced with the present subjunctive, the imperfect subjunctive is far more common. Verbs with a contracted infinitive, such as dire (short for dicere) revert to the longer form in the imperfect subjunctive (to give dicessi etc., for example).

The imperfect subjunctive is used in subordinate clauses taking the subjunctive where the sense of the verb requires the imperfect.
 English: "It seemed that Elsa was not coming."
 Italian: "Sembrava che Elsa non venisse."
 English: "The teacher slowed down, so that we would understand everything."
 Italian: "L’insegnante rallentava, affinché capissimo tutto."

The imperfect subjunctive is used in "if" clauses, where the main clause is in the conditional tense, as in English and German.
 English: "If I had a lot of money, I would buy many cars."
 Italian: "Se avessi molti soldi, comprerei tante macchine."
 English: "You would know if we were lying."
 Italian: "Sapresti se mentissimo."
Perfect and pluperfect subjunctives

The perfect and pluperfect subjunctives are formed much like the indicative perfect and pluperfect, except the auxiliary (either avere or essere) verb takes the present and imperfect subjunctive respectively.

They are used in subordinate clauses which require the subjunctive, where the sense of the verb requires use of the perfect or pluperfect.
 English: "Although they had not killed the doctor, the police arrested the men."
 Italian: "Benché non avessero ucciso il medico, la polizia arrestò gli uomini."
 English: "I would have done it, provided you had helped me."
 Italian: "Lo avrei fatto, purché tu mi avessi assistito."

Spanish
The subjunctive mood (subjuntivo) is a fundamental element of Spanish. Its spoken form makes use of it to a much larger degree than other Latin languages and it is in no case homonymous to any other mood. Furthermore, it is common to find long complex sentences almost entirely in the subjunctive.

The subjunctive is used in conjunction with impersonal expressions and expressions of emotion, opinion, desire or viewpoint. More importantly, it applies to most hypothetical situations, likely or unlikely, desired or not. Normally, only certitude of (or statement of) a fact will remove the possibility of its use. Unlike French, it is also used in phrases expressing the past conditional. The negative of the imperative shares the same form with the present subjunctive.

Common introductions to the subjunctive would include the following:
 que... or de que... as in que sea (present subjunctive) lo que Dios quiera (present subjunctive): "Let it be what God wills".
 Si...: "If.." (e.g. si estuvieras: "if you were...")
 Donde: "Where.." (e.g. donde sea, "anywhere")
 Cuando: "When.." (referring to a future time, e.g. cuando vaya, "when I go")
 Aunque: "Despite/although/even if..."
 Ojalá... "I hope..." (derived from Arabic  in šāʾ ʾallāh "God willing") e.g. Ojalá que llueva (present subjunctive) "I hope it rains" or Ojalá que lloviera (past subjunctive) "I wish it would rain".

Nevertheless, the subjunctive can stand alone to supplant other tenses.

For example, "I would like" can be said in the conditional Querría or in the past subjunctive Quisiera, as in Quisiera (past subjunctive) que vinieras (past subjunctive), i.e. "I would like you to come".

Comfort with the subjunctive form and the degree to which a second-language speaker attempts to avoid using it is a good way to gauge his or her fluency in the language. Complex use of the subjunctive is a constant pattern of everyday speech among native speakers but difficult to interiorize even by relatively proficient Spanish learners (e.g. I would have liked you to come on Thursday: Me habría gustado (conditional perfect) que vinieras (past subjunctive) el jueves.

An example of the subtlety of the Spanish subjunctive is the way the tense (past, present or future) modifies the expression "be it as it may" (literally "be what it be"):
 Sea lo que sea (present subjunctive + present subjunctive): "No matter what/whatever."
 Sea lo que fuera (present subjunctive + past subjunctive): "Whatever it were."
 Fuera lo que fuera (past subjunctive + past subjunctive): (Similar meaning to above).
 Sea lo que fuere. (Present subjunctive + future subjunctive): "Whatever it may be."
 Fuera lo que hubiera sido. (Past subjunctive + past pluperfect subjunctive): "Whatever/no matter what it may have been".

The same alterations could be made to the expression Sea como sea or "no matter how" with similar changes in meaning.

Spanish has two past subjunctive forms. They are almost identical, except that where the "first form" has -ra-, the "second form" has -se-. Both forms are usually interchangeable although the -se- form may be more common in Spain than in other Spanish-speaking areas. The -ra- forms may also be used as an alternative to the conditional in certain structures.

Present subjunctive

In Spanish, a present subjunctive form is always different from the corresponding present indicative form. For example, whereas English "that they speak" or French "qu'ils parlent" can be either indicative or subjunctive, Spanish "que hablen" is unambiguously subjunctive. (The corresponding indicative would be "que hablan".) The same is true for all verbs, regardless of their subject.

When to use:
 When there are two clauses, separated by que. However, not all que clauses require the subjunctive mood. They must have at least one of the following criteria:
 As the fourth edition of Mosaicos states, when the verb of the main clause expresses emotion (e.g. fear, happiness, sorrow, etc.)
 Impersonal expressions are used in the main clause. (It is important that...)
 The verb in the second clause is the one that is in subjunctive.

Examples:
 Ojalá que me compren (comprar) un regalo. (I hope that they will buy me a gift.)
 Te recomiendo que no corras (correr) con tijeras. (I recommend that you not run with scissors.)
 Dudo que el restaurante abra (abrir) a las seis. (I doubt that the restaurant might open at six.)
 Lo discutiremos cuando venga (venir). (We will talk about it when he/she comes.)
 Es importante que (nosotros) hagamos ejercicio. (It is important that we exercise.)
 Me alegro de que (tú) seas mi amiga. (I am happy that you are my friend.)
Past (imperfect) subjunctive

Used interchangeably, the past (imperfect) subjunctive can end either in "-se" or "-ra". Both forms stem from the third-person plural (ellos, ellas, ustedes) of the preterite. For example, the verb "estar", when conjugated in the third-person plural of the preterite, becomes "estuvieron". Then, drop the "-ron" ending, and add either "-se" or "-ra". Thus, it becomes "estuviese" or "estuviera". The past subjunctive may be used with "if... then" statements with the conditional mood. Example:
 Si yo fuera/fuese el maestro, no mandaría demasiados deberes. (If I were the teacher, I would not give too much homework.)
Future subjunctive

In Spanish, the future subjunctive tense is now rare but still used in certain dialects of Spanish and in formal speech. It is usually reserved for literature, archaic phrases and expressions, and legal documents. (The form is similar to the "-ra" form of the imperfect subjunctive, but with a "-re" ending instead of "-ra", "-res" instead of "-ras" and so on.) Example:
 Si así yo no lo hiciere, que Dios y la patria me lo demanden. (If I don't do it, may God and the fatherland demand it from me.)

Phrases expressing the subjunctive in a future period normally employ the present subjunctive. For example: "I hope that it will rain tomorrow" would simply be "Espero que llueva mañana" (where llueva is the third-person singular present subjunctive of llover, "to rain").

Pluperfect (past perfect) subjunctive

In Spanish, the pluperfect subjunctive tense is used to describe a continuing wish in the past. "Desearía que (tú) hubieras ido al cine conmigo el viernes pasado." (I wish that you had gone to the movies with me last Friday). To form this tense, first the subjunctive form of haber is conjugated (in the example above, "haber" becomes "hubieras"). Then the participle of the main verb (in this case is added, "ir" becomes "ido").
 Me gustaría que 'hubieras ido'/'hubieses ido', pero él suspendió su examen de matemáticas. (I would have liked if you had gone, but he failed his math test.)

Though the "-re" form appears to be more closely related to the imperfect subjunctive "-ra" form than the "-se" form, that is not the case. The "-se" form of the imperfect subjunctive derives from the pluperfect subjunctive of Vulgar Latin and the "-ra" from the pluperfect indicative, combining to overtake the previous pluperfect subjunctive ending. The "-re" form is more complicated, stemming (so to speak) from a fusion of the perfect subjunctive and future perfect indicative—which, though in different moods, happened to be identical in the second and third persons—before losing the perfect in the shift to future subjunctive, the same perfect nature that was the only thing the forms originally shared. So the "-ra" and "-se" forms always had a past (to be specific, pluperfect) meaning, but only the "-se" form always belonged with the subjunctive mood that the "-re" form had since its emergence.

Portuguese
In Portuguese, as in Spanish, the subjunctive (subjuntivo or conjuntivo) is complex, being generally used to talk about situations which are seen as doubtful, imaginary, hypothetical, demanded, or required. It can also express emotion, opinion, disagreement, denial, or a wish. Its value is similar to the one it has in formal English:

Present subjunctive
 Command:  Faça-se luz! "Let there be light!"
 Wish:  Viva o rei! "Long live the king!"
 Necessity: É importante que ele compreenda isso. "It is important that he understand that."
 In certain, subordinate clauses:
 Ainda que seja o meu aniversário... "Even though it be my birthday..."
 Antes que eu vá... "Before I go..."
Imperfect (past) subjunctive

As in Spanish, the imperfect subjunctive is in vernacular use, and it is employed, among other things, to make the tense of a subordinate clause agree with the tense of the main clause:
 English: It is [present indicative] necessary that he speak [present subjunctive]. → It was [past indicative] necessary that he speak [present subjunctive].
 Portuguese: É [present indicative] necessário que ele fale [present subjunctive]. → Era necessário [past (imperfect) indicative] que ele falasse [past (imperfect) subjunctive].

The imperfect subjunctive is also used when the main clause is in the conditional:
 English: It would be [conditional] necessary that he speak [present subjunctive].
 Portuguese: Seria [conditional] necessário que ele falasse [imperfect subjunctive].

There are authors who regard the conditional of Portuguese as a "future in the past" of the indicative mood, rather than as a separate mood; they call it futuro do pretérito ("future of the past"), especially in Brazil.

Future subjunctive

Portuguese differs from other Ibero-Romance languages in having retained the medieval future subjunctive (futuro do subjuntivo), which is rarely used in Spanish and has been lost in other West Iberic languages. It expresses a condition that must be fulfilled in the future, or is assumed to be fulfilled, before an event can happen. Spanish and English will use the present tense in this type of clause.

For example, in conditional sentences whose main clause is in the conditional, Portuguese, Spanish and English employ the past tense in the subordinate clause. Nevertheless, if the main clause is in the future, Portuguese will employ the future subjunctive where English and Spanish use the present indicative. (English, when being used in a rigorously formal style, takes the present subjunctive in these situation, example: "Should I be, then...") Contrast the following two sentences.
 English: If I were [past subjunctive] king, I would end [conditional] hunger.
 Spanish: Si fuera [imperfect subjunctive] rey, acabaría con [conditional] el hambre.
 Portuguese: Se fosse [imperfect subjunctive] rei, acabaria com [conditional] a fome.
 English: If I am [present indicative] [technical English is "should I be" present subjunctive] elected president, I will change [future indicative] the law.
 Spanish: Si soy [present indicative] elegido presidente, cambiaré [future indicative] la ley.
 Portuguese: Se for [future subjunctive] eleito presidente, mudarei [future indicative] a lei.

The first situation is counterfactual; the listener knows that the speaker is not a king. However, the second statement expresses a promise about the future; the speaker may yet be elected president.

For a different example, a father speaking to his son might say:
 English: When you are [present indicative] older, you will understand [future indicative].
 Spanish: Cuando seas [present subjunctive]  mayor, comprenderás [future indicative].
 French: Quand tu seras [future indicative] grand, tu comprendras [future indicative].
 Italian: Quando sarai [future indicative] grande, comprenderai [future indicative].
 Portuguese: Quando fores [future subjunctive] mais velho, compreenderás [future indicative].

The future subjunctive is identical in form to the personal infinitive in regular verbs, but they differ in some irregular verbs of frequent use. However, the possible differences between the two tenses are due only to stem changes. They always have the same endings.

The meaning of sentences can change by switching subjunctive and indicative:
 Ele pensou que eu fosse alto (He thought that I was tall [and I am not])
 Ele pensou que eu era alto (He thought that I was tall [and I am or I am not sure whether I am or not])
 Se formos lá (If we go there)
 Se vamos lá (equivalent to "if we are going there")

Below, there is a table demonstrating subjunctive and conditional conjugation for regular verbs of the first paradigm (-ar), exemplified by falar (to speak) .

Compound subjunctives

Compound verbs in subjunctive are necessary in more complex sentences, such as subordinate clauses with embedded perfective tenses e.g., perfective state in the future. To form compound subjunctives auxiliar verbs (ter or haver) must conjugate to the respective subjunctive tense, while the main verbs must take their participles.

Queria que houvesses sido eleito presidente (I wish you had been elected president)
É importante que hajas compreendido isso. (It is important that you have comprehended that)
Quando houver sido eleito presidente, mudarei a lei (When I will have been elected president, I will change the law)
A cidade haver-se-ia afundado se não fosse por seus alicerces (The city would have sunk, if not for its foundation)

Romanian

Romanian is part of the Balkan Sprachbund and as such uses the subjunctive (conjunctiv) more extensively than other Romance languages. The subjunctive forms always include the conjunction să, which within these verbal forms plays the role of a morphological structural element. The subjunctive has two tenses: the past tense and the present tense. It is usually used in subordinate clauses.

Present subjunctive

The present subjunctive is usually built in the 1st and 2nd person singular and plural by adding the conjunction să before the present indicative (indicative: am I have; conjunctive: să am (that) I have; indicative: vii you come; conjunctive: să vii (t/hat) you come). In the 3rd person most verbs have a specific conjunctive form which differs from the indicative either in the ending or in the stem itself; there is however no distinction between the singular and plural of the present conjunctive in the 3rd person (indicative: are he has; conjunctive: să aibă (that) he has; indicative: au they have; conjunctive: să aibă (that) they have; indicative: vine he comes; conjunctive: să vină (that) he comes; indicative: vin they come; conjunctive: să vină (that) they come).

The present tense is by far the most widely used of the two subjunctive tenses and is used frequently after verbs that express wish, preference, permission, possibility, request, advice, etc.: a vrea to want, a dori to wish, a prefera to prefer, a lăsa to let, to allow, a ruga to ask, a sfătui to advise, a sugera to suggest, a recomanda to recommend, a cere to demand, to ask for, a interzice to forbid, a permite to allow, to give permission, a se teme to be afraid, etc.

When used independently, the subjunctive indicates a desire, a fear, an order or a request, i.e. has modal and imperative values. The present subjunctive is used in questions having the modal value of should:
 Să plec? Should I leave?
 Să mai stau? Should I stay longer?
 De ce să plece? Why should he/she leave?

The present subjunctive is often used as an imperative, mainly for other persons than the second person. When used with the second person, it is even stronger than the imperative. The first-person plural can be preceded by the interjection hai, which intensifies the imperative meaning of the structure:
 Să mergem! Let us go! or Hai să mergem! Come on, let's go!
 Să plece imediat! I want him to leave immediately!
 Să-mi aduci un pahar de apă! Bring me a glass of water!

The subjunctive present is used in certain set phrases used as greetings in specific situations:
 Să creşti mare! (to a child, after he or she declared his or her age or thanked for something)
 Să ne (să-ţi, să vă) fie de bine! (to people who have finished their meals)
 Să-l (să o, să le etc.) porţi sănătos / sănătoasă! (when somebody shows up in new clothes, with new shoes)
 Dumnezeu să-l (s-o, să-i, să le) ierte! (after mentioning the name of a person who died recently)
Past subjunctive

The past tense of the subjunctive mood has one form for all persons and numbers of all the verbs, which is să fi followed by the past participle of the verb. The past subjunctive is used after the past optative-conditional of the verbs that require the subjunctive (a trebui, a vrea, a putea, a fi bine, a fi necesar, etc.), in constructions that express the necessity, the desire in the past:
 Ar fi trebuit să fi rămas acasă. You should have stayed home.
 Ar fi fost mai bine să mai fi stat. It would have been better if we had stayed longer.

When used independently, the past subjunctive indicates a regret related to a past-accomplished action that is seen as undesirable at the moment of speaking:
 Să fi rămas acasă We should have stayed at home. (Note: the same construction can be used for all persons and numbers.)

Celtic languages

Welsh

In Welsh, there are two forms of the subjunctive: present and imperfect. The present subjunctive is barely ever used in spoken Welsh except in certain fixed phrases, and is restricted in most cases to the third person singular. However, it is more likely to be found in literary Welsh, most widely in more old-fashioned registers. The third-person singular is properly used after certain conjunctions and prepositions but in spoken Welsh the present subjunctive is frequently replaced by either the infinitives, the present tense, the conditional, or the future tense (this latter is called the present-future by some grammarians).

The imperfect subjunctive, as in English, only affects the verb bod ("to be"). It is used after pe (a form of "if") and it must be accompanied by the conditional subjunctive e.g. Pe bawn i'n gyfoethog, teithiwn i trwy'r byd. = "If I were rich, I would travel throughout the world."

For all other verbs in Welsh, as in English, the imperfect subjunctive takes the same stems as do the conditional subjunctive and the imperfect indicative.

Scottish Gaelic
In Scottish Gaelic, the subjunctive does exist but still takes the forms from the indicative: the present subjunctive takes the future indicative and the imperfect subjunctive takes the imperfect indicative. The subjunctive is normally used in proverbs or truisms in phrases that start with 'May...'
For example,
 Gum bi Rìgh Ruisiart beò fada! – Long live King Richard (lit. May King Richard live long).
 Gum bi beanachd Dè oirbh uile! – May God bless you all!
 Gun gabh e a fhois ann sìth – May he rest in peace.

Or when used as the conjunction, the subjunctive is used, like every other language, in a more demanding or wishful statement:
 Se àm gum fàg e a-nis. – It is time that he leave now.
 Tha e riatanach gun tèid iad gu sgoil gach là. – It is necessary that they go to school every day.
 Dh'fhaighnich e nach faic mi ise. – He asked that I not see her.

The subjunctive in Gaelic will sometimes have the conjunction gun (or gum before words beginning with b, f, m or p) can be translated as 'that' or as 'May ...' while making a wish. For negatives, nach is used instead.

In Scottish Gaelic, the imperfect subjunctive is exactly the same as the indicative only that it uses robh in both the affirmative and negative forms, as the interrogative does not exist in any subjunctive form in any language, of bi- 'to be' although robh is taken from the interrogative form in the imperfect indicative of bi.

For every other verb in Gaelic, the same follows for the imperfect subjunctive where the interrogative or negative form of the verb is used for both the affirmative and negative form of the verb and, like Welsh, the imperfect subjunctive forms can be exactly the same as the conditional subjunctive forms apart from bi.

Examples:
 Nan robh mi beartach, shiubhalainn air feadh an t-saoghail. - If I were rich, I would travel throughout the world.
 Nan nach dèanadh mi m' obair-dhachaigh, bhithinn air bhith ann trioblaid. - If I had not done my homework, I would have been in trouble.

Native speakers would tend to use the following for the second of the above examples:
 Mur nach robh mi air m'obair-dhachaigh a dhèanamh, bhithinn ann an trioblaid

Irish
In the Irish language (Gaeilge), the subjunctive, like in Scottish Gaelic (its sister language), covers the idea of wishing something and so appears in some famous Irish proverbs and blessings. It is considered an old-fashioned tense for daily speech (except in set phrases) but still appears often in print.

The subjunctive is normally formed from "Go" (which eclipses, and adds "n-" to a verb beginning with a vowel), plus the subjunctive form of the verb, plus the subject, plus the thing being wished for. For instance, the subjunctive form of "téigh" (go) is "té":
 Go dté tú slán.  –  May you be well. (lit: may you go well)

Or again, the subjunctive of "tabhair" (give) is "tuga":
 Go dtuga Dia ciall duit. –  May God give you sense.

Or to take a third example, sometimes the wish is also a curse, like this one from Tory Island in Donegal:
 Go ndéana an Diabhal toirneach de d'anam in Ifreann. – May the Devil make thunder of your soul in Hell.

The subjunctive is generally formed by taking the stem of the verb and adding on the appropriate subjunctive ending depending on broad or slender, and first or second conjugation. For example, to the stem of bog (to move) is added -a giving as its subjunctive in the first person boga mé:

First conjugation:

Second conjugation:

E.g. "go mbeannaí Dia thú" – May God bless you.

There is also some irregularity in certain verbs in the subjunctive. The verb bí (to be) is the most irregular verb in Irish (as in most Indo-European languages):

The Irish phrase for "thank you" – go raibh maith agat – uses the subjunctive of "bí" and literally means "may there be good at-you".

Some verbs do not follow the conjugation of the subjunctive exactly as conjugated above. These irregularities apply to verbs whose stem ends already in a stressed vowel and thus due to the rules of Irish orthography and pronunciation, cannot take another. For example:

 Although feoigh doesn't have a síneadh fada (accent), the 'o' in this position is stressed (pronounced as though it is ó) and thus the subjunctive is irregular.

Where the subjunctive is used in English, it may not be used in Irish and another tense might be used instead. For example:
 If I were (past subjunctive) you, I would study for the exam tomorrow. – Dá mba (past/conditional of the copula) mise tusa, dhéanfainn (conditional) staidéar le haghaidh an scrúdaithe amárach.
 I wish *(that) you were (past sub.) here. – Is mian liom go raibh (present sub.) tú anseo.
 It is important that he choose (present sub.) the right way—Tá sé tábhachtach go roghnóidh (future indicative) sé ar an mbealach ceart.
 When you're older (present ind.), you'll understand – Nuair a bheidh/bheas (future ind.) tú níos sine, tuigfidh tú.
 Note that in English, the relative pronoun that can be omitted; in Irish, the corresponding go must be retained.
 Note that in English, the present tense is often used to refer to a future state whereas in Irish there is less freedom with tenses (i.e. time is more strictly bound to the appropriate tense, present for present, past for past, future for future). In this particular example, you will be older and it is then that you will understand.

Indo-Aryan languages

Hindi-Urdu 
There are two subjunctive moods in Hindi-Urdu (Hindustani), first the regular subjunctive and the second, the perfective subjunctive which superficially has the same form as the perfective aspect forms of verbs but still expresses future events, it is only ever used with if clauses and relative pronouns. In a semantic analysis, this use of the perfective aspect marker would not be considered perfective, since it is more closely related to subjunctive usage. Only the superficial form is identical to that of the perfective.

The regular subjunctive mood can be put in two tenses; present and future. There is another mood, called the contrafactual mood, which serves as both the past subjunctive and the past conditional mood in Hindustani. Hindi-Urdu, apart from the non-aspectual forms (or the simple aspect) has three grammatical aspects (habitual, perfective & progressive) and each aspect can be put five grammatical moods (indicative, presumptive, subjunctive, contrafactual & imperative). The subjunctive mood can be put in the present tense only for the verb honā (to be) for any other verb only the future sujunctive form exists. Subjunctive mood forms for all the three grammatical aspects of Hindustani for the verbs honā (to be) and karnā (to do) are shown in the table below.

Slavic languages
The Slavic languages lost the Proto-Indo-European subjunctive altogether, while the old optative was repurposed as the imperative mood. Some modern Slavic languages have developed a new subjunctive-like construction, although there is no consistent terminology. For example, some authors do not distinguish the subjunctive mood from the optative ("wishing") mood,
others do.

Polish
The subjunctive mood is formed using the by particle, either alone or forming a single word with the complex conjunctions żeby, iżby, ażeby, aby, coby. The mood does not have its own morphology, but instead a rule that the by-containing particle must be placed in front of the dependent clause. Compare:
 Upieram się, że wychodzi indicative - I insist that he is leaving;
 Upieram się, (że)by wyszedł subjunctive - I insist that he leave;
 Upieram się, że wyszedłby conditional - I insist that he would leave.

The subjunctive mood in the dependent clause is obligatory in the case of certain independent clauses, for example it is incorrect to say chcę, że to zrobi, but the subjunctive mood must be used instead: chcę, by to zrobił.

The subjunctive can never be mistaken with the conditional, despite that in the case of the conditional mood the clitic by and derivatives can move. See that in the following examples:
 Upieram się, że wtedy by nie wyszedł conditional - I insist that he would not have left then [at that time];
 Upieram się, że by wówczas nie wyszedł conditional - I insist that he would not have left then/[at that time]/[in that case];
 Myślę, że on by akurat wyszedł conditional - I think that he would have just left [a moment ago];
 Myślę, że gdyby wyszedł, ... conditional - I think, that if he would have left, ...
There is no conjunction, which would indicate the subjunctive. In particular, there is no żeby.

Compare to the closely related optative mood, e.g. the subjunctive nie nalegam, by wysłał list vs the optative oby wysłał list.

Bulgarian
Modal distinctions in subordinate clauses are expressed not through verb endings, but through the choice of complementizer -  че (che) or да (da) (which might both be translated with the relative pronoun "that"). The verbs remain unchanged. In ordinary sentences, the imperfective aspect is most often used for the indicative, and the perfective for the subjunctive, but any combination is possible, with the corresponding change in meaning.
 e.g. iskam da stanesh (perfective) / iskam da stavash (imperfective) - i want you to get up.
The latter is more insisting, since the imperfective is the more immediate construction. Thus:
 Indicative - че -
 e.g. знам, че си тук - znam, che si tuk - I know that you are here;
 Subjunctive - да -
 e.g. настоявам да си тук - nastoyavam da si tuk - I insist that you be here.

Semitic languages

Arabic
In Standard/Literary Arabic, the verb in its imperfect aspect (al-muḍāri‘) has a subjunctive form called the manṣūb form. It is distinct from the imperfect indicative in most of its forms: where the indicative has "-u", the subjunctive has "-a"; and where the indicative has "-na" or "-ni", the subjunctive has nothing at all. (The "-na" ending in the second and third-person plural feminine is different: it marks the gender and number, not the mood, and therefore it is there in both the indicative and subjunctive.)
 Indicative third singular masc. yaktubu "he writes / is writing / will write" → Subjunctive yaktuba "he may / should write"
 Indicative third plural masc. yaktubūna "they write" → Subjunctive yaktubū "they may write"
 Indicative third plural fem. yaktubna "they write" = Subjunctive yaktubna "they may write"

The subjunctive is used in that-clauses, after Arabic an: urīdu an aktuba "I want to write." However, in conditional and precative sentences, such as "if he goes" or "let him go", a different mood of the imperfective aspect, the jussive, majzūm, is used.

In many spoken Arabic dialects, there remains a distinction between indicative and subjunctive; however, it is not through a suffix but rather a prefix.

In Levantine Arabic, the indicative has b- while the subjunctive lacks it:
 third sing. masc. huwwe byuktob "he writes / is writing / will write", versus yuktob "he may / should write"
 third plural masc. homme byukotbu, versus yukotbu

Egyptian Arabic uses a simple construction that precedes the conjugated verbs with (law "if") or (momken "may"); the following are some examples:
 (Law/Momken enti tektebi. "If /Maybe you write") (s.f)
 (Law/Momken enti katabti. "If /Maybe you wrote") (s.f)
 (Law/Momken enti konti tektebi."If /Maybe you would write") (s.f)
 (Law/Momken enti ḥatektebi. "If /Maybe you will write") (s.f)

Tunisian Arabic often precedes the imperfective indicative verb by various conjunctions to create the subjunctive:

Ma:
Me ëandk ma tektb. You have nothing to write
Literally: not at.you subj_tool you_write

Ken for wish, hope or opinion:
Netmanna, ken nscoufk nejħ nhar. I wish i'd see you successful one day: Wish
Ken yesclqu. (I) hope they find out: Hope
(Men rayi,) Ken temsci tertêħ. (In my opinion,) It's better [for your health] to relax: Opinion

Taw for a hightly-expected possibility:
Abqa hne, taw toxls. Stay here (and) you will/could get paid

Ra for inevitability but it's, in most cases, accompanied with "ken" in the other clause:
Ken tkoun thëif, rak besc tetëb f ħyetk. Once you get weak, you'll suffer in life

Hebrew
Final short vowels were elided in Hebrew in prehistoric times, so that the distinction between the Proto-Semitic indicative, subjunctive and jussive (similar to Classical Arabic forms) had largely been lost even in Biblical Hebrew. The distinction does remain for some verbal categories, where the original final morphemes effected lasting secondary changes in word-internal syllabic structure and vowel length. These include weak roots with a medial or final vowel, such as yaqūm "he rises / will rise" versus yaqom "may he rise" and yihye "he will be" versus yehi "may he be", imperfect forms of the hiphil stem, and also generally for first person imperfect forms:  (imperfect indicative of 'sit') vs.  (imperfect cohortative=volitive of 'sit'). In modern Hebrew, the situation has been carried even further, with forms like yaqom and yehi becoming non-productive; instead, the future tense (prefix conjugation) is used for the subjunctive, often with the particle she- added to introduce the clause, if it is not already present (similar to French que).
 "" (Sheyavo) – "Let him come" or "May he come" (literally, "That (he) will come")
 "" (Ani rotzeh sheyavo) – "I want him to come" (literally, "I want that (he) will come")

Biblical subjunctive forms survive in non-productive phrases in such forms as the third-person singular of to be ( – lihyot,  or ) and to live ( – likhyot), mostly in a literary register:
 "" (Y'khi ha-melekh) – "Long live the king" (literally, "Live the-king")
 "" (Lu Y'hi) – "Let it be" (literally, "if it be") (a popular song in Hebrew, by Naomi Shemer)

Akkadian
Subordinate clauses in Babylonian and Standard Babylonian Akkadian are marked with a -u on verbs ending in a consonant, and with nothing after vocalic endings or after ventive endings. Due to the consonantal structure of semitic languages, and Akkadian sound laws, the addition of the -u might trigger short vowels in the middle of the word to disappear. Assyrian Akkadian uses a more complicated system with both -u and -ni as markers of subordination. The ending -ni was used in the instances where -u could not be used as stated above. During Middle and Neo Assyrian the -ni ending became compulsory on all subordinate verbs, even those that already had the -u, resulting in -ni and-ūni as markers of subordination.

Uralic languages

Hungarian
This mood in Hungarian is generally used to express polite demands and suggestions. The endings are identical between imperative, conjunctive and subjunctive; it is therefore often called the conjunctive-imperative mood.

Examples:
 Add nekem! – 'Give it to me.' – demand
 Menjünk! – 'Let's go.' – suggestion
 Menjek? – 'Shall I go?' – suggestion or question
 Menj! – 'Go!' – demand

Note that "demand" is nowhere near as rude as it might sound in English. It is a polite but firm request, but not as polite as, say, "would you...".

The characteristic letter in its ending is -j-, and in the definite conjunctive conjugation the endings appear very similar to those of singular possession, with a leading letter -j-.

An unusual feature of the mood's endings is that there exist a short and a long form for the second person singular (i.e. "you"). The formation of this for regular verbs differs between the indefinite and definite: the indefinite requires just the addition of -j, which differs from the longer ending in that the last two sounds are omitted (-j and not -jél for example in menj above, cf. menjél). The short version of the definite form also drops two letters, but another two. It drops, for example: the -ja- in -jad, leaving just -d, as can be seen in add above (instead of adjad).

There are several groups of exceptions involving verbs that end in -t. The rules for how this letter, and a preceding letter, should change when the subjunctive endings are applied are quite complicated, see the article Hungarian verbs.
As usual, gemination of a final sibilant consonant is demonstrated when a j-initial ending is applied:
mos + -jak gives mossak 'let me wash' (-j- changes to -s-)

When referring to the demands of others, the subjunctive is demonstrated:
kérte, hogy menjek. 'He asked that I go. (He asked me to go.)' Here, "I go" is in the subjunctive.

Turkic languages

Turkish
There is no one-to-one relationship between the subjunctive mode in foreign languages and the modes in Turkish. The subjunctive mode of other languages can be compared with imperative mode (emir kipi), necessitative mood (gereklilik kipi), optative mood (istek kipi), desiderative mood (dilek kipi), conditional mood (şart kipi)  in Turkish. Of the above 5 moods, 3 moods (istek kipi, şart kipi, dilek kipi) are additionally translated as "subjunctive mode " too.

Examples of the optative mood (istek kipi) are gideyim (Let me go), gitsin (Let him go), gidelim (Let us go), gitsinler (Let them go). Suggested actions and desires are expressed with the optative verb. The suffixes -(y)eyim, -(y)elim, and other forms are used to form an optative verb. The Turkish optative means 'let someone do something' in English. Forming the optative: 
. The suffix -(y)eyim/ -(y)ayım. The suffix -(y)eyim or -(y)ayım is used for the singular form of the first person according to the last vowel of the verb and it means 'let me do'. Use the suffix  -(y)ayım: if the last vowel of the word is a, ı, o, or u. Use the suffix -(y)eyim: if the last vowel of the word is e, i, ö, or ü. If the verb root ends in a vowel the letter 'y' is added after the verb root: ağlamak (to cry) -> ağlayayım (let me cry); uyumak (to sleep) -> uyuyayım (let me sleep).
 The suffix -(y)elim/ -(y)alım. The suffix -(y)elim or -(y)alım is used for the plural form of the first person according to the last vowel of the verb and it means 'let us do'. Use the suffix  -(y)alım: if the last vowel of the word is a, ı, o, or u. Use the suffix -(y)elim: if the last vowel of the word is e, i, ö, or ü. Bugün araba sürelim. (Let's drive a car today.) Bu akşam için kek yapalım. (Let's make a cake for tonight.)

An example of a conditional mode (şart kipi) is: Çalışırsa kazanır (If he works, he wins. (simple present), he will win (simple future)), çalıştıysa kazanır (If he worked, he might win. (simple present)).

An examples of an necessitative mood (gereklilik kipi)  is: Benim gelmem gerek (I must/ have to come), Dün toplantıya katılman gerekirdi (You should have attended the meeting yesterday. (but you didn’t)).

An example of an imperative mode (emir kipi)  is: siz gelin (Let you come), onlar gelsinler (Let them come).

An examples of an desiderative mood (dilek kipi) is: Ah! şimdi burada olsaydı (Oh! If/ if only he were here now); Keşke burada olaydı (I wish he were here).; Keşke arabam olsa da otobüse binmesem (I wish I had a car, so I don't (need to) get on the bus.); Keşke arabam olsaydı da otobüse binmeseydim (I wish I had a car, so I didn't (need to) get on the bus.); Keşke arabam olsa o zaman otobüse binmem(If I had a car, I wouldn't get on the bus.); Keşke arabam olsaydı o zaman otobüse binmezdim(I wish I had a car then I wouldn't get on the bus).

References

External links
 Subjunctive in Bulgarian - On the Intersection between the Old Church Slavonic Subjunctive and Modern Bulgarian Renarrative forms
 The English subjunctive: scholarly opinions
The Bulgarian Subjunctive Mood from a Historical Point of View - a lecture in Russian by assoc. prof. Ivan Iliev

Grammatical moods